The Weight of Water is a 2000 mystery thriller film based on Anita Shreve's 1997 novel The Weight of Water. Directed by Kathryn Bigelow, the film stars Elizabeth Hurley, Catherine McCormack, Sean Penn, Josh Lucas, Vinessa Shaw, Katrin Cartlidge, Ciaran Hinds, and Sarah Polley. The film was shot in Nova Scotia. Although it premiered at the 2000 Toronto International Film Festival, it was not released in the United States until November 1, 2002.

Plot

In 1873, Karen Christensen and Anethe Christensen, Norwegian immigrants, are murdered on Smuttynose Island, a lonely island among the Isles of Shoals off the New Hampshire coast. Maren Hontvedt, also a Norwegian immigrant, survived the attack. Louis Wagner, who had once tried to seduce Maren, is convicted for the crime, and ultimately dies on the gallows.

In the present, newspaper photographer Jean Janes begins researching the murders, and travels to Smuttynose with her husband Thomas, an award-winning poet. They travel with Thomas's brother Rich, who owns a boat, and Rich's girlfriend Adaline. In a twist of fate, Jean discovers archived papers apparently written by Maren Hontvedt, and giving an account of her life on the island, and the murders.

The plot unfolds the narrative of the papers and Hontvedt's testimony against Wagner that gets him hanged, while Jean privately struggles with jealousy as Adaline openly flirts with Thomas. Trying to suppress her fears of Adaline as a rival, Jean learns that Maren was brought from Norway to Smuttynose by her husband, a man she has no passion for. Maren staves off melancholy and loneliness on the isolated island by keeping busy. Maren's spirits are lifted when her brother arrives on the island with his new wife, Anethe Christensen. But Maren must also contend with her own sister Karen, who is stern and suspicious. At first, Maren views Anethe as a rival for the affections of Maren's brother. Soon, however, she begins to nurse a desire for Anethe. On the night of the murders, with Maren's and Anethe's husbands away from the island, Maren draws close to Anethe, only to be caught by Karen. Maren's sister condemns her. In a fury of her own, Maren kills Karen and Anethe.

The movie ends with Hontvedt trying to confess before he is hanged. The courts refuse to accept Maren's confession, and Wagner dies on the gallows.

Cast

 Elizabeth Hurley as Adaline Gunne
 Catherine McCormack as Jean Janes
 Sean Penn as Thomas Janes
 Sarah Polley as Maren Hontvedt
 Rita Kvist as young Maren
 Josh Lucas as Rich Janes
 Ciarán Hinds as Louis Wagner
 Ulrich Thomsen as John Hontvedt
 Anders W. Berthelsen as Evan Christenson
 Jan Tore Kristoffersen as young Evan
 Katrin Cartlidge as Karen Christenson
 Vinessa Shaw as Anethe Christenson
 Richard Donat as Mr. Plaisted
 Adam Curry as Emil Ingerbretson
 Karl Juliusson as Mr. Christenson
 Michele Maillet (uncredited) as Mrs. Ingerbretson

Reception
On Rotten Tomatoes, the film has an approval rating of 35%, based on reviews from 65 critics. The site's critical summary reads: "The story is too muddled to build any interest". On Metacritic, the film has a score of 45 out of 100, based on reviews from 22 critics.

Critics felt that Bigelow had not achieved as much weight with the fictional story of the present against her portrayal of the events of the past. Stephen Holden of The New York Times said: "There is so much to admire in The Weight of Water, Kathryn Bigelow's churning screen adaptation of a novel by Anita Shreve, that when the movie finally collapses on itself late in the game, it leaves you in the frustrating position of having to pick up its scattered pieces and assemble them as best you can". Holden felt the two stories "never mesh".

Accolades
 2000: Nominated - San Sebastián International Film Festival – Golden Seashell for Kathryn Bigelow
 2001: Winner - Film by the Sea International Film Festival – Film and Literature Award for Kathryn Bigelow

References

External links
 
 

2000 films
2000 crime drama films
2000s mystery thriller films
English-language French films
French crime drama films
French mystery thriller films
French thriller drama films
American crime drama films
American mystery thriller films
American psychological thriller films
2000s English-language films
Films directed by Kathryn Bigelow
Films based on American novels
Films based on crime novels
Films set in Maine
Films set in the 1870s
Films shot in Mexico
Films shot in Nova Scotia
French nonlinear narrative films
American nonlinear narrative films
2000 psychological thriller films
StudioCanal films
Films scored by David Hirschfelder
2000s American films
2000s French films